Ivo Frank Fairbairn-Crawford (born Ivo Frank Fairbairn Crawford; 20 December 1884 – 24 August 1959) was a British middle-distance runner. He competed at the 1908 Summer Olympics in London, and was educated at Felsted.

In the 800 metres, Crawford won his heat in the first round easily, with a time of 1:57.8. He was disqualified in the final, however. Crawford also won his first round heat in the 1500 metres event. He placed fifth in the final with a time of 4:07.6.

Crawford's sister was Loris Callingham, who was killed in the torpedoing of RMS Leinster in 1918. Their father was Frank Fairbairn Crawford, who played first-class cricket in England and South Africa before being killed in the Second Boer War. An uncle, Rev. John Charles Crawford, and his three sons (Ivo and Loris's cousins), Jack, Reginald, and Vivian, all also played first-class cricket, with Jack playing for England.

References

Sources

External links 
 Profile at Sports-Reference.com

1884 births
1959 deaths
Athletes (track and field) at the 1908 Summer Olympics
Olympic athletes of Great Britain
British male middle-distance runners